Thomas Max Smallwood (born 30 March 1995) is a French professional basketball player for CB Menorca of the LEB Plata.

College career
As a freshman, Smallwood averaged 3.9 points and 1.9 rebounds per game. Following his junior season, he transferred to Chattanooga, becoming the program's first graduate transfer. Smallwood averaged six points per game.

Professional career
Smallwood started his professional career with ESSM Le Portel in his native France.

In August 2020, Smallwood signed a one-year contract with Aris Leeuwarden of the Dutch Basketball League (DBL). He played one game with Aris before the season was suspended due to the COVID-19 pandemic. He left Aris to sign with Union Tours Basket Metropole in France. Smallwood averaged 6.3 points and 3.0 rebounds per game. On August 27, 2021, he signed with CB Menorca of the LEB Plata.

References

External links
Chattanooga Mocs bio
RealGM profile

1995 births
Living people
Centers (basketball)
Chattanooga Mocs men's basketball players
ESSM Le Portel players
Dutch Basketball League players
Aris Leeuwarden players
French expatriate basketball people in the United States
French men's basketball players
Sportspeople from Roanne
UAB Blazers men's basketball